Bold is the second album by Angie & Debbie Winans, released in 1997. Angelique and Debra Renee are the ninth and tenth siblings, respectively, in the Winans family, a family of gospel music artists from Detroit, Michigan. This album contains a song entitled "Not Natural", denouncing homosexuality. This led to protests by GLAAD.

Track listing

Musicians
Guitars: Paul Jackson, Andrew Ramsey
Drums: Dee Holt
Trumpet Solo: Rod McGaha
Sax solo: Mark Douthit
Strings: Nashville String Machine
String Conductor & Arr.: Ronn Huff
All other instruments, Track arr.: Cedric Caldwell, Victor Caldwell
Background vocals: Tiffany Palmer, Duawne Starling, Debbie Winans, Angie Winans
Bold voice: Duane Hamilton
Strange Woman Intro: Tiffany Palmer
Rap Vocal: Mike-E (Michael Ellis Wright)
Lead vocals: Debbie Winans, Angie Winans

Production
Engineers: Cedric Caldwell, Victor Caldwell, Joey Verge, Bryant Russell
Recorded at: Father's Image, Quad Studio
Mixed by: Cedric Caldwell, Victor Caldwell
Mixed at: Father's Image
Producers: Cedric Caldwell, Victor Caldwell for Caldwell Plus Production
Mastering: Marty Williams at The Workstation
Art Direction: Louis Upkins, Jr.
Design: Louis Upkins, Jr. - DesignHouse, Wendi Powell - Kairos Designs
Hair: Sandy Alsup, Shelia Littleton
Photographer: Michael Gomez
Stylist: Rene' Image Agency
Make-Up: Derrick Rutledge, For About Face
Exicutive Producers: Cedric Caldwell, Victor Caldwell, Angie Winans, Debbie Winans
 
All track information and credits were taken from the CD liner notes.

References

1997 albums